Marian Lăzărescu (born 17 July 1984) is a Romanian luger who has competed since 1999. He finished 15th in the men's doubles event at the 2006 Winter Olympics in Turin.

Lăzărescu's best finish at the FIL World Luge Championships was 18th in the men's doubles event at Park City, Utah in 2005.

References
2006 luge men's doubles results
FIL-Luge profile

External links
 

1984 births
Living people
Romanian male lugers
Olympic lugers of Romania
Lugers at the 2006 Winter Olympics